NDSA may refer to:
National Digital Stewardship Alliance, now the National Digital Information Infrastructure and Preservation Program
New German School of Alexandria (Neue Deutsche Schule Alexandria)
National Defense Space Architecture